Junior Fisher (born 2 April 1978) is a Caymanian footballer who plays as a defender. He has represented the Cayman Islands at full international level.

References

Association football defenders
Living people
1978 births
Caymanian footballers
Cayman Islands international footballers
George Town SC players
Scholars International players